Large means of great size.

Large may also refer to:

Mathematics
 Arbitrarily large, a phrase in mathematics
 Large cardinal, a property of certain transfinite numbers
 Large category, a category with a proper class of objects and morphisms (or both)
 Large diffeomorphism, a diffeomorphism that cannot be continuously connected to the identity diffeomorphism in mathematics and physics
 Large numbers, numbers significantly larger than those ordinarily used in everyday life
 Large ordinal, a type of number in set theory
 Large sieve, a method of analytic number theory
 Larger sieve, a heightening of the large sieve
 Law of large numbers, a result in probability theory
 Sufficiently large, a phrase in mathematics

Other uses 
 Large (film), a 2001 comedy film
 Large (surname), an English surname
 LARGE, an enzyme
 Large, a British English name for the maxima (music), a note length in mensural notation
 Large, or G's, or grand, slang for $1,000 US dollars
 Large, a community in Jefferson Hills, Pennsylvania

See also
 
 
 Big (disambiguation)
 Giant (disambiguation)
 Huge (disambiguation)
 Humongous (disambiguation)
 Macro (disambiguation)
 Size (disambiguation)